J. The Jewish News of Northern California, formerly known as Jweekly, is a weekly print newspaper in Northern California, with its online edition updated daily. It is owned and operated by San Francisco Jewish Community Publications Inc. It is based in San Francisco, California.

History
The origins of J. The Jewish News of Northern California date from November 22, 1895, when the San Francisco newspaper The Emanu-El, began publications, In 1932, a merger occurred with a competing Jewish newspaper, the Jewish Journal. In 1946, following a merger, it changed its name to the Jewish Community Bulletin, in 1979 it was renamed the San Francisco Jewish Bulletin, in 1984 it was renamed the Northern California Jewish Bulletin,  in 2003 it was renamed j. the Jewish news weekly of Northern California, and in 2017 it was renamed J. The Jewish News of Northern California.

Editor and coverage
Sue Fishkoff is its editor, Jo Ellen Green Kaiser is the CEO and Steve Gellman is publisher. Marc S. Klein was the editor and publisher emeritus, having retired in September 2011 after nearly 28 years at the helm. Nora Contini retired as associate publisher in the summer of 2013.

The newspaper "covers the full range of what it means to be Jewish today – from the arts to religion, food, lifecycle events and news of our local, national and global communities." Dan Pine is one of the major writers, covering local political issues, campus events and controversies, and other topic.  Genealogist Nate Bloom is a regular contributor publishing his findings on which celebrities are of full or partial Jewish descent, whether they are practitioners of Judaism, and if they are converts to the faith.

See also
List of Jewish newspapers in the United States

References

External links
Official website
American Jewish Press Association Member Profile  
Directory information available to members only - Current AJPA Members

Jewish newspapers published in the United States
Publications established in 1895
Newspapers published in San Francisco
1895 establishments in California
Weekly newspapers published in California